Charlotte Edith Anderson Monture (10 April 1890 – 3 April 1996), known simply as Edith Monture, was a Mohawk WWI veteran, known as the first Indigenous-Canadian woman to become a registered nurse, as well as to gain the right to vote in a Canadian federal election. She was the first Indigenous woman from Canada to serve in the United States military.

Early life 
Charlotte Edith Anderson was born on 10 April 1890 on the Six Nations reserve at Ohsweken near Brantford, Ontario, Canada. She was the youngest in a family of eight children of Mohawk descent, attending day school on the reserve and earning a high school diploma from Brantford Collegiate Institute.

Career and overseas service  in First World War 
She had to train as a nurse in the United States because all of the Canadian nursing schools refused her due to her race. The Indian Act of 1876 prevented access to higher education to Indigenous people. Edith Anderson studied at the New Rochelle Nursing School in New York and graduated top of her class, becoming the first Indigenous registered nurse in Canada in 1914.

Anderson worked as an elementary school nurse, but left that job in 1917 to join the Army Nurse Corps. It is believed that she was presented with ceremonial Mohawk clothing as burial wear before she left for overseas service in case she died in the war.

She served in France at a military hospital. She was one of fourteen Native-Canadian women who served as members of the Army Nurse Corps during World War I, and was one of only two who served overseas (the other being Cora E. Sinnard (nee Elm) a member of the Oneida tribe who also served in France). 

She was stationed near the front lines, working as a nurse at Base Hospital 23 in Vittel, France, for a year as well as elsewhere in France. She worked 14 hour days, and walked battlegrounds to find and treat the wounded. She treated soldiers injured in trench warfare and gas attacks.

Post war 
Edith Anderson moved back to the Six Nations reserve where she was born after the end of the First World War. The Canadian Military Service Act (1917) gave wartime nurses the right to vote, and under these terms, she became the first Indigenous-Canadian woman to gain the right to vote in a Canadian federal election. It took until 1960 for all Indigenous women to get the federal vote in Canada. 

She continued to work in healthcare and worked as a nurse and midwife a hospital on the reserve until 1955, when she retired aged 65. As Edith Monture she worked hard to improve Indigenous health care. In 1939 Monture was elected honourary president of the Ohsweken Red Cross.

Personal life 
Edith Anderson married Claybran Monture soon after she returned to the reserve and they had five children, Bud, Helen, Ron, Don and Gilbert, who died as an infant in 1929. She had 14 grandchildren.

Edith Monture died on 3 April 1996 in Ohsweken, Ontario, one week before her 106th birthday and was buried in St. John’s Anglican Cemetery on the reserve.

Commemoration 
Edith Monture Avenue and Edith Monture Park in Brantford, Ontario are named after her.

References

1890 births
1996 deaths
Canadian women in World War I
Female wartime nurses
Female nurses in World War I
Indigenous Canadian feminists
Women in World War I
First Nations women
20th-century Canadian women

Women centenarians
Canadian centenarians